Mamet may refer to:
 Clara Mamet (born 1994), American actress and musician; daughter of David Mamet
David Mamet (born 1947), American playwright, essayist, screenwriter, and film director
Milton Mamet, fictional character from the American television series The Walking Dead (portrayed by Dallas Roberts)
Edham Mamet or Nag Mohammed (born 1975), Uyghur refugee
Zosia Mamet (born 1988), American actress who has appeared in various television series; daughter of David Mamet
Lynn Mamet, an American theatre director, playwright, screenwriter, and television producer; sister of David Mamet
Noah Mamet (born 1969), United States Ambassador to Argentina